Local elections in Devon are held every four years in order to vote for councillors on Devon County Council. There are a total of 62 councillors on the council. Since 1998, Plymouth and Torbay have been unitary authorities, making them independent of Devon County Council.

Political control
The county council was established in 1889. The council's functions and territory were reformed under the Local Government Act 1972. The first election following those reforms was held in 1973, with the council assuming its altered powers on 1 April 1974. Political control of the council since 1973 has been held by the following parties:

Leadership
The leaders of the council since 1973 have been:

Council elections
1973 Devon County Council election
1977 Devon County Council election
1981 Devon County Council election
1985 Devon County Council election
1989 Devon County Council election
1993 Devon County Council election
1997 Devon County Council election
2001 Devon County Council election
2005 Devon County Council election
2009 Devon County Council election
2013 Devon County Council election
2017 Devon County Council election
2021 Devon County Council election

County result maps

By-election results

References

External links
 Devon Council

 
Council elections in Devon
County council elections in England